This is a list of Austrian football transfers for the 2018–19 winter transfer window by club. Only transfers of clubs in the Austrian Football Bundesliga are included.

Austrian Football Bundesliga

Admira Wacker

In:

Out:

Austria Wien

In:

Out:

LASK

In:

Out:

Rapid Wien

In:

Out:

Red Bull Salzburg

In:

Out:

SCR Altach

In:

Out:

St. Pölten

In:

Out:

Sturm Graz

In:

Out:

SV Mattersburg

In:

Out:

TSV Hartberg

In:

Out:

Wacker Innsbruck

In:

Out:

Wolfsberger AC

In:

Out:

References

External links
 Official site of the ÖFB
 Official site of the Bundesliga

Football transfers winter 2018–19
Transfers
2018–19